Clovis II (633 – 657) was King of Neustria and Burgundy, having succeeded his father Dagobert I in 639. His brother Sigebert III had been King of Austrasia since 634. He was initially under the regency of his mother Nanthild until her death in her early thirties in 642. Nanthild's death allowed Clovis to fall under the influence of the secular magnates, who reduced the royal power in their own favour; first Aega and then Erchinoald. The Burgundian mayor of the palace Flaochad used him to lure his rival, Willebad, to a battle in Autun, where Willebad was killed.

Background
Clovis' wife, Balthild, whose Anglo-Saxon origins are now considered doubtful, was sold into slavery in Gaul. She had been owned by the Neustrian mayor of the palace, Erchinoald, who gave her to him to garner royal favour. She bore him three sons who all became kings after his death. The eldest, Chlothar, succeeded him and his second eldest, Childeric, was placed on the Austrasian throne by Ebroin while Clovis was still alive. The youngest, Theuderic, succeeded Childeric in Neustria and eventually became the sole king of the Franks.

Clovis was a minor for almost the whole of his reign. He is sometimes regarded as king of Austrasia during the interval 656–57 when Childebert the Adopted usurped the throne. Grimoald, mayor of the palace of Austrasia, and his son Childebert the Adopted were captured and later executed in Paris by Clovis II, the king of Neustria, in 657. He is often regarded as an early roi fainéant. Noted Belgian historian Henri Pirenne stated that Clovis "died insane."

Clovis II is buried in Saint Denis Basilica, Paris.

References

Works cited

External links

Merovingian kings
633 births
657 deaths
Medieval child monarchs
Burials at the Basilica of Saint-Denis
7th-century Frankish kings